Wang Yusuo (born 1964) is a Chinese billionaire businessman. He is the founder and chairman of ENN Group, a natural gas distribution company.

Early life
Wang has a bachelor's degree from the People's University of China, and a doctorate from Tianjin University.

Career
Wang is the chairman of ENN Group. As of November 2015, Forbes estimated his net worth at US$3.2 billion.

Personal life
He is married and lives in Langfang, China.

References

1964 births
Living people
Chinese billionaires
Chinese company founders
Chinese energy industry businesspeople
Renmin University of China alumni
Politicians of the People's Republic of China
Tianjin University alumni
People from Bazhou, Hebei